Phosphoserine phosphatase is an enzyme that in humans is encoded by the PSPH gene.

Function 

The protein encoded by this gene belongs to a subfamily of the phosphotransferases. This encoded enzyme is responsible for the third and last step in L-serine formation. It catalyzes magnesium-dependent hydrolysis of L-phosphoserine and is also involved in an exchange reaction between L-serine and L-phosphoserine. Deficiency of this protein is thought to be linked to Williams syndrome.

Clinical significance 

Homozygous or compound heterozygous mutations in PSPH cause Neu–Laxova syndrome and Phosphoserine phosphatase deficiency.

Model organisms 

Model organisms have been used in the study of PSPH function. A conditional knockout mouse line called Psphtm1a(EUCOMM)Hmgu was generated at the Wellcome Trust Sanger Institute. Male and female animals underwent a standardized phenotypic screen to determine the effects of deletion. Additional screens performed:  - In-depth immunological phenotyping

References

Further reading

External links